Yves Courteau (born April 25, 1964) is a Canadian former professional ice hockey forward who played in the National Hockey League for the Calgary Flames and Hartford Whalers from 1984–87. Courteau was drafted by the Detroit Red Wings in the 2nd round, 23rd overall in the 1982 NHL Entry Draft. He played 22 games in the NHL, recording two goals and five assists. Courteau also appeared in one playoff game with the Flames in 1986.

Courteau was born in Montreal, Quebec. He represented Canada at the 1984 World Junior Hockey Championship.Married with 2 kids.

Career statistics

Regular season and playoffs

International

External links 

1964 births
Living people
Binghamton Whalers players
Calgary Flames players
Canadian ice hockey right wingers
Colorado Flames players
Detroit Red Wings draft picks
French Quebecers
Hartford Whalers players
Ice hockey people from Montreal
Laval Voisins players
Moncton Golden Flames players